Charm City Art Space  is a music venue/art space located at 1731 Maryland Avenue, in Baltimore, Maryland, in the Station North arts district.  This area is home to several do it yourself (DIY) projects, including the Velocipede Bike Project, and the Jerk Store.  It is also known as the space, the art space, or CCAS.

The CCAS opened in summer 2002 to be a community-run facility where artists and musicians could showcase their work. The CCAS is a mixed-used facility with frequent art exhibits and a large zine library, but it has functioned primarily as a music venue for smaller independent music acts. It hosted its first show July 1. As of October 2009, it had hosted more than 1000 shows, mostly hardcore punk and indie acts, including The Thermals, Modern Life Is War, Majority Rule.

It has outlasted similar venues in the area.  

The CCAS is collectively run, and allows members to teach and book shows. At monthly meetings, members discuss finances, membership, and maintenance and repair of the space. It is a non-discriminatory venue where people of all ages, genders, races, and religions may come and feel welcome.  The venue is also drug- and alcohol-free.

The CCAS has drawn inspiration from larger independent music venues such as 924 Gilman, and ABC No Rio, and the Mr. Roboto Project.

External links
 Charm City Art Space
 City Paper Article
 7 Years and the 1000th Show: An Interview with Mike Riley on Aural States (Oct 2009)

Music venues in Baltimore
Art museums and galleries in Maryland
Punk rock venues
Tourist attractions in Baltimore
Art galleries established in 2002
2002 establishments in Maryland
All-ages DIY venues in the United States